The Western Base Party was a successful exploration party of the Australasian Antarctic Expedition. The eight-man Western Party was deposited by the SY Aurora on the Shackleton Ice Shelf at Queen Mary Land. The leader of the team was Frank Wild and the party included the geologist Charles Hoadley.
  
The party established the Queen Mary Land Station. An early setback was the destruction of the radio mast in the first blizzard. Severe weather impeded activities as did dangerous crevices. The team sent an expedition into Kaiser Wilhelm II Land.

The party had no supplies for a second winter. The Western Base Party was collected on February 23, 1913 by the Aurora, with no loss of life.

Discoveries
The Western Base Party made a number of discoveries including;
 Adams Island
 Bay of Winds
 Cape Penck
 Cape Hoadley
 Cape Hordern
 Denman Glacier
 Pobeda Ice Island
 Farr Bay (discovered in November 1912)
 Henderson Island (discovered in August 1912)
 Hippo Island
 Scott Glacier
 Mount Sandow
 Mount Amundsen

Drygalski Island was first sited by the Western Base Party but it was not until the return voyage of Australasian Antarctic Expedition that the island was accurately identified.

A.L. Kennedy was cartographer of the expedition.  He was later honored by the Advisory Committee on Antarctic Names (US-ACAN)'s naming of Kennedy Peak (Antarctica) for him, in recognition of the close correlation of his 1912–13 running survey of the eastern half of the Queen Mary Coast with the US-ACAN map of 1955 compiled from aerial photographs.

See also

 Douglas Mawson

References

Exploration of Antarctica
Antarctic expeditions
1912 in Antarctica
1913 in Antarctica
Australasian Antarctic Expedition